Duy Tiên is a town of Hà Nam Province in the Red River Delta region of Vietnam. As of 2003, the town had a population of 131,244. The town covers an area of 134 km2. The district capital lies at Hòa Mạc.

See also
Đọi Sơn Pagoda
Châu Giang

References

Districts of Hà Nam province
County-level towns in Vietnam
Populated places in Hà Nam province